Datong (Ta Tung) High School may refer to:

 Shanghai Datong High School
 Datong High School (Taipei)